The Fisher of Songs (Spanish: El pescador de coplas) is a 1954 Spanish musical comedy film directed by Antonio del Amo and starring Marujita Díaz, Tony Leblanc and Antonio Molina.

Plot 
In the marshes of San Fernando (Cádiz) lives María del Mar (Marujita Díaz) and her spirited brother, between fishing and fishing they dedicate themselves to singing and looking for love.

This was not the first of the many films starring the singer Antonio Molina, who became one of the most sought-after artists of the time, in it he sings, among others, I want to be a matador, María de los Remedios and Mar Blanca are already turning off two stars, Fisherman of couplets, Goodbye to Spain.

Cast
 Marujita Díaz as María del Mar  
 Tony Leblanc as Rafa  
 Antonio Molina as Juan Ramón  
 Manuel Monroy as Miguel  
 Vicente Parra as Pretendiente de María del Mar  
 Manuel Zarzo as Mauriño  
 Luis Moscatelli as Gandul  
 Salvador Soler Marí as Don Javier  
 Luis Pérez de León as Negociante de barcas  
 Aníbal Vela as Don José  
 Manuel Arbó as Almirante  
 José Franco as Director de escena 
 José Prada as Don Paco  
 Laura Valenzuela as Secretaria de Don Javier 
 Manuel Guitián as Supervisor pesca  
 Arturo Marín as Barquero  
 Francisco Bernal as Joaquín  
 Teófilo Palou as Asistente de Don Javier  
 Agustín Rivero 
 Lita Norman 
 Paul Ellis

References

Bibliography 
 de España, Rafael. Directory of Spanish and Portuguese film-makers and films. Greenwood Press, 1994.

External links 
 

1954 musical comedy films
Spanish musical comedy films
1954 films
1950s Spanish-language films
Films directed by Antonio del Amo
Spanish black-and-white films
1950s Spanish films